Cervical effacement or cervical ripening refers to a thinning of the cervix.

Background 
Cervical effacement is a component of the Bishop score and can be expressed as a percentage.

Prior to effacement, the cervix is like a long bottleneck, usually about four centimeters in length. Throughout pregnancy, the cervix is tightly closed and protected by a plug of mucus. When the cervix effaces, the mucus plug is loosened and passes out of the vagina. The mucus may be tinged with blood and the passage of the mucus plug is called bloody show (or simply "show"). As effacement takes place, the cervix then shortens, or effaces, pulling up into the uterus and becoming part of the lower uterine wall. Effacement may be measured in percentages, from zero percent (not effaced at all) to 100 percent, which indicates a paper-thin cervix. 

Results from a systematic review of the literature found no differences in cesarean delivery nor neonatal outcomes in women with low-risk pregnancies between inpatient or outpatient cervical ripening.

Effacement is accompanied by cervical dilation.

References

Childbirth
Midwifery
Obstetrics